Andreas Wels (born 1 January 1975) is a German  competitive and synchronized diver. He has competed at three Olympic Games.

In 1997 he won his first international title, European Champion in competitive diving on the 1 m springboard. In 1999 he became vice world cup champion in competitive diving on the 3 m springboard, and in 2000 European Champion in synchronized diving on the 3 m springboard together with his partner Tobias Schellenberg.

In 2002 he became vice European Champion in competitive diving and synchronized diving on the 3 m springboard. At the 2003 World Aquatics Championships in Barcelona he won bronze in synchronized diving on the 3 m springboard. In 2004 he became European Champion in competitive diving on the 3 m springboard.

At the 2004 Olympic Games in Athens Andreas Wels and Tobias Schellenberg won the silver medal in synchronized diving on the 3 m springboard. They also won the silver medal in synchronized diving on the 3 m springboard at the 2005 World Aquatics Championships in Montreal and a gold at the 2006 European Aquatics Championships in Budapest.

References

External links 
 Official Homepage

1975 births
Living people
People from Schönebeck
German male divers
Olympic divers of Germany
Olympic silver medalists for Germany
Divers at the 1996 Summer Olympics
Divers at the 2000 Summer Olympics
Divers at the 2004 Summer Olympics
Olympic medalists in diving
Medalists at the 2004 Summer Olympics
World Aquatics Championships medalists in diving
Sportspeople from Saxony-Anhalt
21st-century German people
20th-century German people